The following Confederate States Army units and commanders fought in the Seven Days Battles (from June 25 to July 1, 1862) of the American Civil War. Order of battle compiled from the army organization during the battle, the casualty returns and the reports. The Union order of battle is listed separately.

Abbreviations used

Military rank
 Gen = General
 MG = Major General
 BG = Brigadier General
 Col = Colonel
 Ltc = Lieutenant Colonel
 Maj = Major
 Cpt = Captain
 Lt = Lieutenant

Other
 (w) = wounded
 (mw) = mortally wounded
 (k) = killed in action
 (c) = captured

Army of Northern Virginia

Gen Robert E. Lee

Jackson's Command
MG Thomas J. Jackson

D. H. Hill's Division

Magruder's Command
MG John B. Magruder

Longstreet's Division

Huger's Division

A. P. Hill's Light Division

Department of North Carolina

Artillery Reserve

Cavalry

Notes

References
 U.S. War Department, The War of the Rebellion: a Compilation of the Official Records of the Union and Confederate Armies, U.S. Government Printing Office, 1880–1901.

American Civil War orders of battle